Under the Banyan Tree and Other Stories is a collection of short stories by R. K. Narayan, set in and around the fictitious town of Malgudi in South India. The stories range from the humorous to the serious and all are filled with Narayan's acute observations of human nature. The concluding story, Under the Banyan Tree, is about a village story-teller who concludes his career by taking a vow of silence for the rest of his life, realizing that a story-teller must have the sense to know when to stop and not wait for others to tell him.

1985 short story collections
Short story collections by R. K. Narayan
Heinemann (publisher) books
Viking Press books